The Patriot Yue Fei is a 2013 Chinese television series based on the life of Yue Fei, a Song dynasty general widely regarded as a patriot and national hero in Chinese culture for his role in defending the Song empire against the Jurchen campaigns. While the plot is based on historical sources, it also includes elements of fiction and draws ideas from the novel General Yue Fei and other folktales on the general's life.

Huang Xiaoming stars as the title character in the biopic, which started shooting in 2011. The budget of the series exceeded ¥200 million (roughly US $30 million). The first episode premiered on 4 July 2013.

Cast

Yue Fei and family
 Huang Xiaoming as Yue Fei, a Song general known for resisting invaders from the Jin dynasty for decades and patriotism; he was tragically executed for trumped-up charges by the very regime he served, resulted of him being a deified martyr in Chinese history.
 Cheng Pei-pei as Lady Yao, Yue Fei's mother.
 Gao Yuqing as Yao Gun, Yue Fei's maternal uncle.
 Yang Zheng as Yue Xiang, Yue Fei's younger brother.
 Ruby Lin as Li Wa (Li Xiao'e), Yue Fei's wife.
 Zhou Bin as Yue Yun, Yue Fei's eldest son and subordinate.
 Zheng Wei as Yue Yun (teenager)
 Hong Weijia as Yue Yun (child)
 Zhang Zhixi as Yue Anniang, Yue Fei's daughter.
 Du Hanmeng as Yue Anniang (teenager)
 Zhang Zimu as Yue Anniang (child)
 Wan Changhao as Yue Ting, Yue Fei's third son.
 Yang Sichen as Yue Ting (teenager)
 Zhao Yuanyuan as Juan'er, Wu Susu's maid, later as Yue Yun's wife (historical archetype was Lady Gong).
 Wang Kexin as Juan'er (child)

Yue Fei's associates and colleagues
 Wu Xiubo as Gao Chong, Yue Fei's subordinate and a descendant of Gao Huaide.
 Cecilia Liu as Lady Yang, Gao Chong's wife.
 Roy Wong as Zhang Yong, Yue Fei's subordinate.
 Kang Kai as Niu Gao, Yue Fei's subordinate.
 Cui Lin as Zhang Xian, Yue Fei's subordinate.
 Zhang Yun as Fu Qing, Yue Fei's subordinate.
 Wang Haixiang as Yang Zaixing, Yue Fei's subordinate.
 Yan Yanlong as Wang Gui, Yue Fei's subordinate.
 Shao Bing as Han Shizhong, a Song general also known for resisting invaders from the Jin dynasty.
 Viann Zhang as Liang Hongyu, Han Shizhong's wife.
 Yu Rongguang as Zhou Tong, Yue Fei's mentor.
 Jenny Zhang as Wu Susu, a youxia and Yue Fei's close friend.

Song dynasty figures

House of Zhao (Song imperial family)
 Allen Ting as Zhao Gou (Emperor Gaozong), the tenth ruler of the Song dynasty.
 Shi Yanjing as Zhao Ji (Emperor Huizong), the eighth ruler of the Song dynasty and the father of the emperors Qinzong and Gaozong.
 Cheng Wu as Zhao Huan (Emperor Qinzong), the ninth ruler of the Song dynasty.
 Liu Chenxia as Lady Wei, Emperor Huizong's consort and Emperor Gaozong's mother.
 Jiang Xuanmi as Lady Zheng, Emperor Huizong's wife.
 Yan Luyang as Empress Zhu, Emperor Qinzong's wife.
 Huang Xiaoge as Empress Xing / Empress Wu, Emperor Gaozong's wives.

Song imperial court

 Gallen Lo as Qin Hui, a treacherous Song minister who played an important role in Yue Fei's death.
 Lu Yong as Zong Ze, a Song general and Yue Fei's superior after Liu Ge and mentor in military tactics.
 Chen Zhihui as Liu Ge, a Song general and Yue Fei's superior and friend.
 Liu Enyou as Prince Liang, a descendant of Chai Rong.
 An Yaping as Wang Xie
 Wang Li as Du Chong
 Yang Liu as Liu Zhengyan
 Wang Teng as Zong Xin
 Li Haohan as Yuwen Xuzhong
 Zeng Hongsheng as Wan Sixie
 Zhang Di as Liang Xing
 Wu Zhensu as Zhang Danian
 Yang Zhe as Zhang Suo
 Hai Zi as Wang Yan
 Bi Zhenlin as Wang Yuan
 Liu Kui as Li Gang
 He Qiang as Wang Boyan
 Cheng Liuyi as Zhang Bangchang
 Yang Yi as Tong Guan
 Bai Zhicheng as Yuan He
 Chen Dacheng as Kang Lü
 Zhou Zhonghe as Eunuch Yao
 Lu Ying as Han Xiaozhou
 Tian Jingliang as Zhao Ding
 Zhang Guoqing as Cai Jing
 Zhao Yiyang as Qin Xi
 Yang Sheng as Zhang Jun, a corrupt general and a member of Qin Hui's party who contributes Yue Fei's execution.  
 Li Da as Miao Fu
 Zeng Hongsheng as Moqi Xie, a corrupt investigating censor and a member of Qin Hui's party who contributes Yue Fei's execution.

Jin dynasty figures
 Steve Yoo as Wanyan Zongbi (Jin Wuzhu), the fourth prince of Jin and Yue Fei's primary nemesis in the battlefield.
 An Zehao as Hamichi, Jin Wuzhu's subordinate.
 Jiang Zhengyang as Consort Ling, Jin Wuzhu's consort.
 Wang Wei as Wanyan Zongwang (Wolibu), the second prince of Jin.
 Wu Zhuohan as Wanyan Zonghan (Nianhan), a nephew of Emperor Taizong
 Li Zhenqi as Wanyan Sheng (Emperor Taizong), the second ruler of the Jin dynasty.
 Song Wenbin as Wuleng Simou
 Zhao Jiaqi as Wanyan Dan (Emperor Xizong), the third ruler of the Jin dynasty.
 Gangzhao Riga as Xia Jinwu

Others

 Angel Wang as Zhao Xiaoman, Zhao Ding's daughter and Qin Hui's concubine; she plots to assassinate Qin Hui.
 Liu Lanfang as storyteller
 Wang Zixuan as Wushima, a woman from Western Xia; she later becomes Zhang Yong's wife.
 Hou Yousheng as Duyanlong
 Ying Er as Jiangnan beauty
 Dong Yue as Guiniang
 Zhong Yunpeng as Liu Banxian
 Zhu Anzhou as Dajiaoya
 Qiu Shiyou as Han Chang
 Liu Fucai as Meng Bangjie
 Zhao Qiusheng as Zhang Chao
 Sang Weilin as Cao Cheng
 Li Yonglin as Ji Qian, a bandit chief.
 Sun Jiaolong as Ji Yong, a bandit chief.
 Ren Daiqian as Lady Wang, Qin Hui's wife and a member of her husband's political party
 Liu Shengwen as Liang Zaiping, Liang Hongyu's brother.
 Yuyang Fangxin as Xiaohui, Li Xiao'e's servant.
 Fei Fei as Qingwan
 Chen Gang as Zhao Yun
 Wang Cheng as Gao Hu
 Lü Shilei as Gao Bao
 Ling Yilei as Gao Long
 Wang Qirui as guard
 Yuan Shuai as guard
 Ding Lan as servant

Soundtrack
 Opening theme: The Rain Hasn't Stop by Wakin Chau and Tarcy Su
 Ending theme: The Legend of Yue Fei by Tan Jing and Huang Xiaoming
 Silver Armour, Green-clothed Blouse by Han Hong
 Aligned with the Emperor by Yi Hong
 A Leaping Heart by Huang Xiaoming
 The Most Beautiful Time by Bibi Zhou
 Patriotic Heart by Nathan Wang

Ratings

Awards and nominations

2013 China TV Drama Awards
 "Top 10 Dramas of the Year" (8th place)
 Nominated - Li Wa (portrayed by Ruby Lin), Viewers' Favorite Female Character
 Nominated - Liu Shishi, Most Popular Actress (Mainland China)
 Nominated - The Most Beautiful Time (performed by Bibi Zhou), Viewers' Favorite TV theme song
2014 13th Huading Awards
 Nominated - Huang Xiaoming, Best Actor in a Chinese TV Series
 Nominated - Ruby Lin, Best Actress in a Chinese TV series
 Won - Gallen Lo, Best Supporting Actor in a Chinese TV series
2014  27th China TV Golden Eagle Award
 Won - Outstanding Television Series
2014 Hengdian Film & Festival of ChinaWon - Best Television SeriesWon''' - Best Director

See also
 Media about Yue Fei
 Eight Thousand Li of Cloud and Moon (TV series), 1988

References

External links
  The Patriot Yue Fei on Sina.com
 

2013 Chinese television series debuts
Chinese historical television series
Television shows set in Kaifeng
Television shows set in Hangzhou
Television series set in the Northern Song
Television series set in the Southern Song
Television series set in the Liao dynasty
Television series set in the Jin dynasty (1115–1234)
Cultural depictions of Yue Fei
Asian wars in television
Anhui Television original programming
Zhejiang Television original programming
Tianjin Television original programming
Shandong Television original programming